"Black Smoke Rising" is a song by American rock band Greta Van Fleet. It was first released on their debut EP Black Smoke Rising in 2017, and then later released again on their double EP From the Fires in 2018. While not released as a single, the song charted briefly on the Billboard Mainstream Rock Songs and was nominated for the Grammy Award for Best Rock Song for the 61st Annual Grammy Awards.

Background
The song was first released on the band's debut EP Black Smoke Rising, and then released again on the band's next release, the double EP From the Fires. On January 18, 2019, the band performed the song and "You're the One" live on Saturday Night Live.

Composition and themes
The song has been described as traditional, guitar-driven rock song, prominently featuring Jake Kiszka's guitar riff hook and lead singer Josh Kiszka's "husky howl". At the 2:30 mark of the song, the song breaks its structure to enter a minute long interlude consisting of Joshua Kiszka's howling vocals and Jacob Kiszka's psychedelic guitar work, before returning to its final chorus. Thematically, the song was inspired by the summers by bonfires of their youth, with Josh Kiszka explaining:

Reception
The song was well-received by critics. Billboard named the song the fifteenth best rock song of 2017, while PopMatters writer William Nesbit named it the best rock song of 2017.

The song received a Grammy Award nomination for the 61st Annual Grammy Awards, for Best Rock Song.

Personnel
Band
Joshua Kiszka – vocals
Jacob Kiszka – guitar, backing vocals
Samuel Kiszka – bass guitar, keyboards, backing vocals
Daniel Wagner – drums, backing vocals

Charts

References

Greta Van Fleet songs
2017 songs